Coleophora silenella is a moth of the family Coleophoridae. It is found in most of Europe, except Fennoscandia, Ireland, Greece, Portugal and Ukraine.

Adults are white with creamy-ochre longitudinal streaks and black speckles. They are on wing from June to August.

The larvae feed on the seeds of Silene otites, Silene densiflora, Silene nutans, Oberna behen and Viscaria vulgaris. They create a tubular silken case which is attached to the side of a seed pod. They feed on the seeds from within this case.

References

silenella
Moths of Europe
Moths described in 1855